Ryan Keith De Vries (born 14 September 1991) is a professional footballer who plays as a forward for Auckland City in the Northern League and the New Zealand National League. Born in South Africa, he has represented the New Zealand national team.

Club career
Born in Cape Town, South Africa, De Vries made his debut for Waitakere United in the 2009–10 New Zealand Football Championship and transferred to Auckland City in 2013. He won the New Zealand Football Championship in each of his first six seasons.

On 18 May 2014, in the OFC Champions League Final second leg, De Vries equalised as Auckland came from behind to defeat Amicale of Vanuatu 2–1, 3–2 on aggregate. In December of that year, he helped his team become the first Oceanian side to come third at the FIFA Club World Cup, putting the team in front in an eventual 1–1 draw with Mexico's Cruz Azul before a penalty shootout victory.

On 17 January 2018, De Vries signed a one-year deal to play for FC Gifu in Japan.

On 25 February 2020, De Vries signed for League of Ireland Premier Division side Sligo Rovers.

De Vries scored three goals during his debut season in Ireland helping Sligo Rovers secure a top four finish. In December 2020 he signed a new contract for the 2021 season. 

In 2022 De Vries returned to New Zealand Football with Auckland City making his comeback in a 4-0 friendly win over West Coast Rangers scoring two goals in the first half.

International career
New Zealand Football initially approached FIFA in 2011 to establish whether De Vries was eligible to play for New Zealand, which he was not at the time. On 8 March 2015, he was called into the New Zealand national football team to play a friendly against South Korea by coach Anthony Hudson. He made his debut in the match in Seoul on 31 March, being substituted at half time for Tyler Boyd in a 0–1 defeat.

Career statistics
Professional appearances – correct as of 1 August 2022.

Honours
Waitakere United
New Zealand Football Championship (4): 2009–10, 2010–11, 2011–12, 2012–13
Charity Cup (1): 2012

Auckland City FC
New Zealand Football Championship (2): 2013–14, 2014–15
Northern League (1): 2022
OFC Champions League (3): 2013–14, 2014–15, 2015–16
FIFA Club World Cup Bronze Medal (1): 2014
Charity Cup (3): 2013, 2015, 2016

References

External links

Living people
1991 births
Association football forwards
Sportspeople from Cape Town
South African emigrants to New Zealand
Waitakere United players
Auckland City FC players
National Premier Leagues players
New Zealand Football Championship players
New Zealand association footballers
New Zealand international footballers
J2 League players
FC Gifu players
Sligo Rovers F.C. players
League of Ireland players
Expatriate association footballers in the Republic of Ireland